The 2016 French Indoor Athletics Championships was the 45th edition of the national championship in indoor track and field for France, organised by the French Athletics Federation. It was held on 27–28 February at the Jean-Pellez Stadium in Aubière. A total of 28 events (divided evenly between the sexes) were contested over the two-day competition.

Results

Men

Women

References

Results
 Results. French Athletics Federation  

French Indoor Athletics Championships
French Indoor Athletics Championships
French Indoor Athletics Championships
French Indoor Athletics Championships
Sport in Puy-de-Dôme